The  is a single-car diesel multiple unit operated by Hokkaido Railway Company (JR Hokkaido) in Japan.

Variants
A total of 27 cars were built, with the class divided into two sub-classes: KiHa 150-0 (17 cars) and KiHa 150-100 (10 cars).
 KiHa 150-0
 KiHa 150-100

KiHa 150-0
Ten KiHa 150-0 cars were built by Fuji Heavy Industries between February and May 1993 and allocated to Asahikawa Depot for use on Furano Line and Nemuro Main Line duties. A further seven cars (KiHa 150-11 to 17) were delivered in January and February 1995, and allocated to Naebo Depot for use on Hakodate Main Line services.

These cars have double-glazed sealed windows with air-conditioning. External livery of the Asahikawa-based cars included a broad light purple waistline stripe with doors painted light purple, while the external livery of the Naebo-based cars included a broad green waistline stripe with doors painted green.

All units in Naebo Depot have been transferred to Asahikawa Depot after the H100 series entered service in 2020, and are re-allocated to Furano Line and Sekihoku Main Line for local train services along with the original Asahikawa Depot units.

KiHa 150-100
Ten KiHa 150-100 cars (KiHa 150-101 to 110) were delivered in May 1993 and allocated to Tomakomai Depot for use on Muroran Main Line duties.

These cars have no air-conditioning, with inward-opening hopper windows. External livery included a broad light green waistline stripe, as on the second batch of KiHa 150-0 cars. The doors are also painted green.

After all KiHa 150-0 cars were re-allocated to Asahikawa Depot, these Tomakomai-based cars are also seen on Sekishō Line and the non-electrified section of Hakodate Main Line.

References

150
Hokkaido Railway Company
Train-related introductions in 1993
Fuji rolling stock